Group B of the 2023 FIFA Women's World Cup will take place from 20 to 31 July 2023. The group consists of hosts Australia, the Republic of Ireland, Nigeria and Canada. The top two teams will advance to the round of 16.

Teams

Notes

Standings

In the round of 16:
 The winners of Group B will advance to play the runners-up of Group D.
 The runners-up of Group B will advance to play the winners of Group D.

Matches
All times listed are local.

Australia vs Republic of Ireland
The match was originally scheduled to take place at Sydney Football Stadium, Sydney. However, FIFA confirmed on 31 January 2022 (Australia time) that the match would be moved to Stadium Australia, Sydney, due to significant interest in tickets.

Nigeria vs Canada

Canada vs Republic of Ireland

Australia vs Nigeria

Canada vs Australia

Republic of Ireland vs Nigeria

Discipline
Fair play points will be used as tiebreakers in the group if the overall and head-to-head records of teams are tied. These are calculated based on yellow and red cards received in all group matches as follows:
first yellow card: minus 1 point;
indirect red card (second yellow card): minus 3 points;
direct red card: minus 4 points;
yellow card and direct red card: minus 5 points;

Only one of the above deductions will be applied to a player in a single match.

References

External links
 

2023 FIFA Women's World Cup